Lha'gyai (ལྷ་རྒྱལ་,  Hajia) is a township in Gonjo County, Tibet Autonomous Region of China.

See also
List of towns and villages in Tibet

Populated places in Tibet